April Fool is the codename for the spy and double agent who allegedly played a key role in the downfall of the Iraqi President Saddam Hussein.

Overview
According to General Tommy Franks, the American commander in the 2003 Iraq conflict, April Fool, an American officer working undercover as a diplomat, was approached by an Iraqi intelligence agent. April Fool sold to the Iraqi false "top secret" invasion plans provided by Franks' team.  This deception successfully misled the Iraqi military into deploying major forces in northern and western Iraq in anticipation of attacks via Turkey or Jordan which never took place. This greatly reduced the defensive capacity in the rest of Iraq and significantly facilitated the actual attacks via Kuwait and the Persian Gulf in the southeast.  Inadequately defended, Baghdad fell to coalition forces within a few weeks and Saddam Hussein's regime collapsed.

See also
Counter-intelligence
Ruse of war

References

People of the Iraq War
Double agents
American spies
Living people
Deception operations
Year of birth missing (living people)